Conditions races are horse races in which the weights carried by the runners are laid down by the conditions attached to the race. Weights are allocated according to the sex of the runners, with female runners carrying less weight than males; the age of the runners, with younger horses receiving weight from older runners to allow for relative maturity, referred to as weight for age; and the quality of the runners, with horses that have won certain values of races giving weight to less successful entrants.

Conditions races are distinct from handicap races, for which the weights carried are laid down by an official handicapper to equalise the difference in ability between the runners. In Great Britain, for example, the British Horseracing Authority's rules define a conditions race as being one "which is none of the following; a Handicap Race or a Novice Race, a race restricted to Maiden Horses, or a race governed by Selling or Claiming provisions."

Conditions races are staged at all levels of horse racing. As all of the most important races in Europe are conditions races, the term may also refer to races for the very best horses, known as Group races. That is not the case in North America and Australia, where handicaps are included in the Group race/Graded race system.

See also
List of horse races
List of British flat horse races
List of French flat horse races
List of Irish flat horse races
List of Australian Group races

References 

Horse racing terminology